Frederick Law Olmsted, the executive director of the United States Sanitary Commission, set up a system of hospital ships for wounded and sick soldiers during the American Civil War. The USSC was a private agency that cooperated closely with the U.S. Army.

City of Memphis and Fanny Bullit
Between 6 and 16 February 1862, Union Army troops advanced across the United States to capture Forts Henry and Donelson. In response to news reports of these combat engagements, members of the U.S. Sanitary Commission who were stationed in Cincinnati, Ohio, began to gather supplies and recruit volunteers to help distribute those supplies and render care to ailing and injured soldiers. Procuring a steamer to transport the most senior members of their commission members to Fort Donelson, they realized upon arrival that the City of Memphis and Fanny Bullitt were essentially empty vessels on which vast numbers of wounded were suffering despite the fact that both vessels had been placed into service as hospital ships. After quickly distributing supplies and beginning their care of the wounded, they then prepared 80 wounded for immediate steamer transport back to Cincinnati with doctors and nurses to tend to them on their voyage. That steamer then also traveled on to additional sites to render further aid to other soldiers who had fallen ill or been wounded at other Union duty stations.

Tycoon and Monarch
In April 1862, the Union's victory at Shiloh resulted in the outpouring of hospital transports to the city.  The two transports refitted and dispatched by the Sanitary Commission were joined by a fleet of private, army, and state hospital ships.  The Tycoon and Monarch were the commission's first refitted hospital ships. Sympathy, benevolence, patriotism and a desire to ease the suffering of their nation's troops was the only thing these groups shared in common. Following this event, the Sanitary Commission began outfitting any hospital ship, army, state, association, or voluntary, and if necessary, they operated the ships as well. All of the army's ships used as hospital transports were refitted and initially supplied through the direction of the Sanitary Commission. Funding came from the army, Sanitary Commission, state, and volunteer organizations. The army transferred at least one ship to the Sanitary Commission, the steamer Daniel Webster No. 1.  Even the Red Rover, a river boat captured by the Union Army, was well equipped and initially staffed by the Sanitary Commission until the ship was sold to the navy.

St. Philip
These were not the first hospital ships employed by the Civil War governments; previous ships used as hospitals, like the hospital ship CSS St. Philip (formerly the Star of the West) in September 1861 and April 1862, retained patients for long periods of time (30–90 days easily) and stayed on station rarely travelling.  The Sanitary Commission used their steamers as a means of bringing wounded further back behind supply lines, keeping wounded on board for as short a time as possible, from 1–7 days.  Men and women of all races, some hired while others volunteered, served throughout the hospital ships and hospitals of the Union as nurses.

The Western Sanitary Commission was a private agency based in St. Louis that was a rival of the larger U.S. Sanitary Commission, doing much the same work. It was led by abolitionists and focused more on the needs of Freedmen.

The Hospital Transport Service
The Sanitary Commission, at the request of the army, created the Hospital Transport Service. It acquired 16 medium and large boats and converted them to hospital ships. Its first major operations came in the Peninsular Campaign of spring 1862, when it serviced casualties from General McClellan's Army of 100,000 men after a series of battles.

The Sanitary Commission quickly organized large fleets of ships and created a network system of routes to move wounded. Rivers and ocean connecting the Union became highway over which the wounded steadily traveled further North.

When possible, few embarkation points were used. Ships were assigned schedules and maximum patient allowances. If a ship embarked more patients than allowed, even though space permitted, her crew would be required to notify the receiving station.  Several ships were kept in reserve, used only when another ship was unable to continue to make a journey.  Thus a very predictable and organized system grew.  On the Pamunkey River, 19 hospital transports working on a fixed schedule moved 700 wounded a day.  Of particular interest, the ships had far greater capacity, some 600 more wounded could have been crammed onto some of the ships.  But, this was frowned upon by the organizers as such a number would overcrowd the ship, overtask the medical staff, erode the quality of care, and place an unexpected burden on the receiving hospital.  Thus, in theory some 70,000 wounded could be moved from Virginia in 100 days to hospitals in five states as far north as New York.  A second inland force of about 16 hospital ships moved patients along riverways north to Missouri, Ohio, and Kentucky.

Hospital ships and boats of the Peninsula Campaign

Hospital boats of the Sanitary Commission
Fanny Bullitt (Ohio River)
City of Alton
Crescent City		
Ruth 			
Glasgow		
Diana			
Nebraska		
Champion		
Baltic			
J. S. Cairns		
Ben Franklin	
Continental	
Hazel Dell
Bickerdyke
Tycoon (Shiloh - Cincinnati)
Monarch (Shiloh - Cincinnati)

Ships outfitted by Sanitary Commission but transferred to Army

Red Rover (Mississippi River) later transferred to Navy	
City of Memphis (Ohio River)
City of Nashville	
City of Louisiana, Renamed R. C. Wood (Ohio River)	
D. A. January*

Footnotes

References

Bibliography  
 
  
 Maxwell, William Quentin. Lincoln's Fifth Wheel: The Political History of the U.S. Sanitary Commission (1956) online edition
  
 Stillé, Charles J. History of the United States Sanitary Commission, Being the General Report of Its Work during the War of the Rebellion (1866), online
 U.S. Navy (Ship's History Section, Naval History Division). History of U.S. Navy Hospital Ship Red Rover (1961)

American Civil War hospitals
United States Sanitary Commission
Hospital ships